All-Russian Committee for Defence of Kuriles is an association in Russia, formed by the 1992 Communist Party of the Soviet Union of Sergei Skvortsov to politically counter the Japanese claims to the Kuriles. It credits itself with having forced president Boris Yeltsin to cancel a trip to Japan.

The association was reconstructed in the early 2000s, their website having press releases dating back to 2001. Skvortsov is the chairman of the association.

References

External links
Press release December 15, 2006

Russian nationalist organizations
Politics of Russia
Political organizations based in Russia
Southern Kuriles
Japan–Russia relations